Styloceras kunthianum is a species of plant in the family Buxaceae. It is endemic to Ecuador.  Its natural habitat is subtropical or tropical moist montane forest. It is threatened by habitat loss.

References

Flora of Ecuador
Endangered plants
kunthianum
Taxonomy articles created by Polbot